The Tamil Nadu State Film Award for Best Villain is given by the state government as part of its annual Tamil Nadu State Film Awardss for Tamil (Kollywood) films. The award was first given in 1997, with Prakash Raj being the first recipient.

The list
Here is a list of the award winners and the films for which they won.

See also
 Tamil cinema
 Cinema of India

References

Actor